The Krenak language, or Botocudo, is the sole surviving language of a small family believed to be part of the Macro-Gê languages. It was once spoken by the Botocudo people in Minas Gerais, but is known primarily by older women today.

Phonology 

/h/ can also have an allophone of a velar [x].

References

Krenak languages
Indigenous languages of South America (Central)
Endangered indigenous languages of the Americas
Indigenous languages of Eastern Brazil